Lou Curtis (5 August 1928 – 27 September 2014) was an Australian cricketer. He played one first-class match for South Australia in 1950/51.

See also
 List of South Australian representative cricketers

References

External links
 

1928 births
2014 deaths
Australian cricketers
South Australia cricketers